La Serratella is a municipality located in the province of Castellón, Valencian Community, Spain.

References 

Municipalities in the Province of Castellón
Alt Maestrat